Thomas Dietsch (born 8 August 1974) is a French former professional cross-country mountain biker. He retired after the 2014 season.

Major results

2000
 1st  National Cross-country Championships
 1st Roc d'Azur
2001
 1st Roc d'Azur
2002
 2nd  European XCM Championships
2003
 1st  European XCM Championships
2004
 1st  European XCM Championships
 2nd  UCI World XCM Championships
2006
 1st  National XCM Championships
2007
 1st Overall UCI XCM World Cup
 3rd  UCI World XCM Championships
2008
 1st  National XCM Championships
2009
 1st  National XCM Championships
2011
 1st  National XCM Championships
2012
 1st  National XCM Championships
2013
 1st  National XCM Championships
2014
 1st  National XCM Championships

References

External links

Living people
French mountain bikers
1974 births
French male cyclists
People from Croix, Nord
Cyclists from Hauts-de-France
Sportspeople from Nord (French department)